Religious Confucianism is an interpretation of Confucianism as a religion. It originated in the time of Confucius with his defense of traditional religious institutions of his time such as the Jongmyo rites, and the ritual and music system.

The Chinese name for Religious Confucianism is Rujiao, in contrast with Secular Confucianism which is called Rujia. The differences can be roughly translated with 教 jiào meaning religion, and 家 jiā meaning school, although the term Rujiao is ancient and predates this modern usage of jiao.

Religious Confucianism includes Chinese traditional patriarchal religion in its practice and some scholars call it Tianzuism instead to avoid confusion with secular Confucianism. It includes such practices as Jisi (祭祀) and Sacrificing to Heaven and Sacrifice to Taishan.

Elements include the deification and worship of Confucius, the seventy-two disciples, Mencius, Zhu Xi, and Shangdi.

Confucianism, together with Buddhism and Daoism, is often called the "Three teachings."

Religious Confucianism has had state sponsorship since the Han dynasty, and in all subsequent major dynasties or historical periods until the 1911 Revolution. The Five Classics became the jurisprudential basis of the national code and the Chinese legal system, and the Spring and Autumn Courts. At the end of the Han Dynasty, Religious Confucianism was widespread. Religious Confucian organizations known as Confucian churches formed in the Qing dynasty have significant popularity among Overseas Chinese people today.

The Origin and Development of Religious Confucianism 
According to He Guanghu, Confucianism may be identified as a continuation of the Shang-Zhou (~1600–256 BCE) official religion, or the Chinese aboriginal religion which has lasted uninterrupted for three thousand years. Both dynasties worshipped the supreme godhead, called Shangdi ( "Highest Deity") or simply Dì by the Shang, and called Tian ( "Heaven") by the Zhou.

Proto-Chinese 

Prior to the formation of Chinese civilisation and the spread of world religions in East Asia, local tribes shared animistic, shamanic and totemic worldviews. Mediatory individuals such as shamans communicated prayers, sacrifices or offerings directly to the spiritual world, a heritage that survives in some modern forms of Chinese religion.

Ancient shamanism is especially connected to ancient Neolithic cultures such as the Hongshan culture. The Flemish philosopher Ulrich Libbrecht traces the origins of some features of Taoism to what Jan Jakob Maria de Groot called "Wuism", i.e. Chinese shamanism.

Xia-Shang 

Ulrich Libbrecht distinguishes two layers in the development of the Chinese theology and religion that continues to this day: traditions derived respectively from the Shang (1600–1046 BCE) and Zhou dynasties (1046–256 BCE). The religion of the Shang was based on the worship of ancestors and god-kings, who survived as unseen divine forces after death. They were not transcendent entities, since the universe was "by itself so", not created by a force outside of it but generated by internal rhythms and cosmic powers. The royal ancestors were called di, "deities", and the utmost progenitor was Shangdi ( "Highest Deity"). Shangdi is identified with the dragon, symbol of the unlimited power (qi), of the "protean" primordial power which embodies yin and yang in unity, associated to the constellation Draco which winds around the north ecliptic pole, and slithers between the Little and Big Dipper (or Great Chariot). Already in Shang theology, the multiplicity of gods of nature and ancestors were viewed as parts of Di, and the four  fāng ("directions" or "sides") and their  fēng ("winds") as his cosmic will.

Zhou 
The Zhou dynasty was more rooted in an agricultural worldview, and they emphasised a more universal idea of Tian ( "Heaven"). The Shang dynasty's identification of Shangdi as their ancestor-god had asserted their claim to power by divine right; the Zhou transformed this claim into a legitimacy based on moral power, the Mandate of Heaven. In Zhou theology, Tian had no singular earthly progeny, but bestowed divine favour on virtuous rulers. Zhou kings declared that their victory over the Shang was because they were virtuous and loved their people, while the Shang were tyrants and thus were deprived of power by Tian.

John C. Didier and David Pankenier relate the shapes of both the ancient Chinese characters for 帝 Di and 天 Tian to the patterns of stars in the northern skies, either drawn, in Didier's theory by connecting the constellations bracketing the north celestial pole as a square, or in Pankenier's theory by connecting some of the stars which form the constellations of the Big Dipper and broader Ursa Major, and Ursa Minor (Little Dipper). Cultures in other parts of the world have also conceived these stars or constellations as symbols of the origin of things, the supreme godhead, divinity and royal power.

Origin of the term Ru 
The character "ru" referred to a jurist who was familiar with the poetry, calligraphy, rituals and music of the Xia, Shang and Zhou dynasties, and was evolved from the four branches of shamanism, history, prayer, and divination of the Spring and Autumn Period. 

According to the Shuowen: Ru, the name of a magician. What magic? The character 儒 Ru contains the radicals for "people" and "rain", and the word "demand" originally means to seek rain to cultivate the farm, and in ancient times it was the function of the magician to pray for rain." 

According to the Fayan: The Zhou dynasty "emphasizes the five teachings of the people, as well as food, funerals, sacrifices. Emphasize honesty and righteousness, revere the morally upright, and reward credit where credit is due. By doing so, all under heaven will naturally achieve peace and harmony."

The rituals, rules, and institutions of the Zhou dynasty were developed from the Xia and Shang dynasties, and were the ideal system in the minds of the Ru. Poetry, calligraphy, ritual and music were central to the learning of the royal officials of the Zhou Dynasty, and were also known as the four teachings of the ancient times, and the textbooks of the nobles of the Zhou Dynasty. The Guoyu records that Shen Shushi (申叔时) included these six ancient books in his list of teaching materials for the education of the royal princes."

Here the Spring and Autumn Period and the World are both history books, and the Order is about the astronomical calendar of seasonal festivals, such as the Ritual Record – Lunar Order. The "Language" refers to the "State Language" and "Family Language", such as the "Confucius Family Language" that has been passed down. The "Guzhi" refers to the "Letters of Zhongxu," "Letters of Tang," "Letters of Da," "Letters of Kang," "Letters of Wine," and "Letters of Luo," which Confucius included in the Shangshu. The "Disciplines" are the "Yao Dian", "Shun Dian", and "Yi Xun" from the "Shang Shu". Confucius brought the learning of the royal officials of the Zhou dynasty to the people, and Religious Confucianism is the ritualism based on poetry, calligraphy, ritual and music, which has been improved by Confucius' inheritance and the interpretation of the Five Classics by sages of later dynasties. Xunzi said, "Therefore, the way of poetry, calligraphy, ritual and music is to be carried forward. The poem is its will, the book is its deeds, the ritual is its deeds, the music is its harmony, and the spring and autumn is its microcosm. Religious Confucianism takes Confucius as the supreme sage and Shangdi as the supreme god, and God assigns kings and teachers to human beings to teach and govern God's people. "Heaven sends down the people as the ruler and the teacher, but it is said that they help God and favor the four directions."

Latter Zhou and Warring States 

By the 6th century BCE the power of Tian and the symbols that represented it on earth (architecture of cities, temples, altars and ritual cauldrons, and the Zhou ritual system) became "diffuse" and claimed by different potentates in the Zhou states to legitimise economic, political, and military ambitions. Divine right no longer was an exclusive privilege of the Zhou royal house, but might be bought by anyone able to afford the elaborate ceremonies and the old and new rites required to access the authority of Tian.

Besides the waning Zhou ritual system, what may be defined as "wild" ( yě) traditions, or traditions "outside of the official system", developed as attempts to access the will of Tian. The population had lost faith in the official tradition, which was no longer perceived as an effective way to communicate with Heaven. The traditions of the "Nine Fields" ( Jiǔyě) and of the Yijing flourished. Chinese thinkers, faced with this challenge to legitimacy, diverged in a "Hundred Schools of Thought", each proposing its own theories for the reconstruction of the Zhou moral order.

Background of Confucian thought 

Confucius (551–479 BCE) appeared in this period of political decadence and spiritual questioning. He was educated in Shang-Zhou theology, which he contributed to transmit and reformulate giving centrality to self-cultivation and human agency, and the educational power of the self-established individual in assisting others to establish themselves (the principle of  àirén, "loving others"). As the Zhou reign collapsed, traditional values were abandoned resulting in a period of moral decline. Confucius saw an opportunity to reinforce values of compassion and tradition into society. Disillusioned with the widespread vulgarisation of the rituals to access Tian, he began to preach an ethical interpretation of traditional Zhou religion. In his view, the power of Tian is immanent, and responds positively to the sincere heart driven by humaneness and rightness, decency and altruism. Confucius conceived these qualities as the foundation needed to restore socio-political harmony. Like many contemporaries, Confucius saw ritual practices as efficacious ways to access Tian, but he thought that the crucial knot was the state of meditation that participants enter prior to engage in the ritual acts. Confucius amended and recodified the classical books inherited from the Xia-Shang-Zhou dynasties, and composed the Spring and Autumn Annals.

Philosophers in the Warring States period, both "inside the square" (focused on state-endorsed ritual) and "outside the square" (non-aligned to state ritual) built upon Confucius's legacy, compiled in the Analects, and formulated the classical metaphysics that became the lash of Confucianism. In accordance with the Master, they identified mental tranquility as the state of Tian, or the One (一 Yī), which in each individual is the Heaven-bestowed divine power to rule one's own life and the world. Going beyond the Master, they theorised the oneness of production and reabsorption into the cosmic source, and the possibility to understand and therefore reattain it through meditation. This line of thought would have influenced all Chinese individual and collective-political mystical theories and practices thereafter.

According to Zhou Youguang, Confucianism's name in Chinese,  rú, originally referred to shamanic methods of holding rites and existed before Confucius' times, but with Confucius it came to mean devotion to propagating such teachings to bring civilisation to the people. Confucianism was initiated by Confucius, developed by Mencius (~372–289 BCE) and inherited by later generations, undergoing constant transformations and restructuring since its establishment, but preserving the principles of humaneness and righteousness at its core.

Doctrine

Tiān and the gods 

Tiān, a key concept in Chinese thought, refers to the God of Heaven, the northern culmen of the skies and its spinning stars, earthly nature and its laws which come from Heaven, to "Heaven and Earth" (that is, "all things"), and to the awe-inspiring forces beyond human control. There are such a number of uses in Chinese thought that it is not possible to give one translation into English.

Confucius used the term in a mystical way. He wrote in the Analects (7.23) that Tian gave him life, and that Tian watched and judged (6.28; 9.12). In 9.5 Confucius says that a person may know the movements of the Tian, and this provides with the sense of having a special place in the universe. In 17.19 Confucius says that Tian spoke to him, though not in words. The scholar Ronnie Littlejohn warns that Tian was not to be interpreted as personal God comparable to that of the Abrahamic faiths, in the sense of an otherworldly or transcendent creator. Rather it is similar to what Taoists meant by Dao: "the way things are" or "the regularities of the world", which Stephan Feuchtwang equates with the ancient Greek concept of physis, "nature" as the generation and regenerations of things and of the moral order. Tian may also be compared to the Brahman of Hindu and Vedic traditions. The scholar Promise Hsu, in the wake of Robert B. Louden, explained 17:19 ("What does Tian ever say? Yet there are four seasons going round and there are the hundred things coming into being. What does Tian say?") as implying that even though Tian is not a "speaking person", it constantly "does" through the rhythms of nature, and communicates "how human beings ought to live and act", at least to those who have learnt to carefully listen to it.

Zigong, a disciple of Confucius, said that Tian had set the master on the path to become a wise man (9.6). In 7.23 Confucius says that he has no doubt left that the Tian gave him life, and from it he had developed right virtue ( dé). In 8.19 he says that the lives of the sages are interwoven with Tian.

Regarding personal gods (shén, energies who emanate from and reproduce the Tian) enliving nature, in the Analects Confucius says that it is appropriate for people to worship ( jìng) them, though through proper rites, implying respect of positions and discretion. Confucius himself was a ritual and sacrificial master. Answering to a disciple who asked whether it is better to sacrifice to the god of the stove or to the god of the family (a popular saying), in 3.13 Confucius says that to appropriately pray gods one should first know and respect Heaven. In 3.12 he explains that religious rituals produce meaningful experiences, and one has to offer sacrifices in person, acting in presence, otherwise "it is the same as not having sacrificed at all". Rites and sacrifices to the gods have an ethical importance: they generate good life, because taking part in them leads to the overcoming of the self. Analects 10.11 tells that Confucius always took a small part of his food and placed it on the sacrificial bowls as an offering to his ancestors.

Other movements, such as Mohism which was later absorbed by Taoism, developed a more theistic idea of Heaven. Feuchtwang explains that the difference between Confucianism and Taoism primarily lies in the fact that the former focuses on the realisation of the starry order of Heaven in human society, while the latter on the contemplation of the Dao which spontaneously arises in nature.

Shangdi 

Contemporary Confucian theologians have emphasised differences between the Confucian idea of Shangdi, conceived as both transcendent and immanent, and act only as a governor of the world, and the Christian idea of God, which they conceived contrary to those of Christian as a deity that is completely otherworldly (transcendent) and is merely a creator of the world.
As mentioned above, sacrifices offered to Shangdi by the king are claimed by traditional Chinese histories to predate the Xia dynasty. The surviving archaeological record shows that by the Shang, the shoulder blades of sacrificed oxen were used to send questions or communication through fire and smoke to the divine realm, a practice known as scapulimancy. The heat would cause the bones to crack and royal diviners would interpret the marks as Shangdi's response to the king. Inscriptions used for divination were buried into special orderly pits, while those that were for practice or records were buried in common middens after use.

Under Shangdi or his later names, the deity received sacrifices from the ruler of China in every Chinese dynasty annually at a great Temple of Heaven in the imperial capital. Following the principles of Chinese geomancy, this would always be located in the southern quarter of the city. During the ritual, a completely healthy bull would be slaughtered and presented as an animal sacrifice to Shangdi. The Book of Rites states the sacrifice should occur on the "longest day" on a round-mound altar. The altar would have three tiers: the highest for Shangdi and the Son of Heaven; the second-highest for the sun and moon; and the lowest for the natural gods such as the stars, clouds, rain, wind, and thunder.

It is important to note that Shangdi is never represented with either images or idols. Instead, in the center building of the Temple of Heaven, in a structure called the "Imperial Vault of Heaven", a "spirit tablet" (shénwèi) inscribed with the name of Shangdi is stored on the throne, Huangtian Shangdi. During an annual sacrifice, the emperor would carry these tablets to the north part of the Temple of Heaven, a place called the "Prayer Hall For Good Harvests", and place them on that throne.

Rites

Jesa 

Jesa is a Confucian ceremony of ancestor veneration.

Sacrifice to Heaven 

Sacrifice to Heaven is a rite of worship of Shangdi. It was originally limited to the nobility., but over time became accessible to commoners. It has many local variations.

Feng Shan 

Feng Shan is a historically very significant ceremony which is performed irregularly on Mount Tai. Completing Feng Shan allowed the emperor to receive the mandate of heaven. It is considered a prerequisite that the empire is in a period of prosperity with a good emperor and auspicious signs to perform the ritual Many sovereigns refused to perform the ritual citing themselves as unworthy of it.

Unlike Sacrifice to Heaven there have been no attempts to replicate this ritual outside of China, but in modern times a commercialized festival claiming continuity is hosted every year

Ritual Music System 

The Ritual and music system is a historical social system that originated in the Zhou Dynasty to maintain the social order. 

The Ritual Music System is divided into two parts: ritual and music. The part of ritual mainly divides people's identity and social norms, and finally forms a hierarchy. The music part is mainly based on the hierarchical system of etiquette, using music to alleviate social conflicts.

Confucius was a very strong advocate of preserving this system. but it died out

Views on whether Confucianism is a religion

Qing Dynasty Views 

The Chinese Rites controversy was a dispute among Roman Catholic missionaries over the religiosity of Confucianism and Chinese rituals during the 17th and 18th centuries. The debate discussed whether Chinese ritual practices of honoring family ancestors and other formal Confucian and Chinese imperial rites qualified as religious rites and were thus incompatible with Catholic belief.

The controversy embroiled leading European universities; the Qing dynasty's Kangxi Emperor and several popes (including Clement XI and Clement XIV) considered the case; the offices of the Holy See also intervened. Near the end of the 17th century, many Dominicans and Franciscans had shifted their positions in agreeing with the Jesuits' opinion, but Rome disagreed. Clement XI banned the rites in 1704. In 1742, Benedict XIV reaffirmed the ban and forbade debate.

Late Qing Dynasty and Early Republican Views 
Liang Qichao was the first to put forward the Religious Confucianism non-teaching theory in "The Theory of the Protection of Religion, not so Respecting Confucius", denying his own earlier Religious Confucianism in the "Bibliography of Western Studies" and arguing that Confucius taught "exclusively in the affairs of the nations of the world. Confucius should be called the same as Socrates, but not with Sakyamuni or Jesus, and "if he is not a religious man, what is the damage to Confucius? Cai Yuanpei and Chen Duxiu developed Liang's Religious Confucianism non-religion, denying that Confucianism was a religion, but not denying that Religious Confucianism had existed after Han Wu Di. Chen Duxiu squarely told Kang Youwei: "My country is not a religious country, my people are not Indians or Jews, and religious beliefs are weak from the beginning" laid the foundation of "no religion in ancient China". As the founders of the New Culture Movement in China, they were supported by all the scholars of the May Fourth period. In 1982, Cui Dahua published "Religious Confucianism" in the sixth issue of Philosophical Studies, and Jin Quan published "Is it the absorption of religious philosophy or the religiousization of Confucianism? Religious Confucianism is not like Daoism, where one can become immortal and ascend to heaven or Buddhism, and it does not have the same kind of afterlife as Christianity and Islam in the West, and Heaven. But this is a different characteristic of the major religions and is not a constituent element of religion. The Judaism, Zoroastrianism, and Shintoism also do not have the concept of the kingdom of heaven, and the Old Testament does not even contain the word "kingdom of heaven".

Civil War to Modern Views 
At the end of 1978, at the founding conference of the Chinese Atheist Society, Ren Jiyu put forward the argument that Confucianism was a religion, and in 1980, Ren published a series of articles formally proposing that "Confucianism is a religion". The first article on Confucianism as a religion was "On the Formation of Confucianism" published in the first issue of Chinese Social Science in 1980, followed by "Confucianism and Confucianism" and other papers. The basis for the Confucianism-is-religion theory is the sacralization of the Confucian classics to establish a Confucian theological system. Theologized Confucianism, which integrates politics, philosophy and ethics into one, forms a vast Confucian system that has always occupied an orthodox position in ideology. The sources of Confucianism are, on the one hand, the theology of providence and the religious idea of ancestor worship during the Yin and Zhou dynasties and, on the other hand, the Confucian doctrine founded by Confucius. The founding of the Doctrine of Science in the Song Dynasty marked the maturity of Confucianism. Confucianism's object of worship is "Heaven and Earth, the ruler and the teacher", and there is a system of deities and rituals for Heaven and Confucius. Its doctrine is the deification and religiousization of the patriarchal system and patriarchal thought. Zhu Xi is very devout to the gods, every major event, to report to Confucius; drought and little rain, to pray to the mountains and rivers and other deities. Zhu Xi's religious feelings, is the typical embodiment of Confucian religious feelings and concentrated representation. The human-god relationship in Confucianism is the expression of the relationship between heaven and man. In Confucianism, heaven is the master of man's fate, and man must submit to the will of heaven. Dong Zhongshu said that heaven has a will, a joy and anger, and can reward good and punish evil. Zhu Xi, based on Dong Zhongshu, rationalized and humanized heaven. It is believed that heaven and moral attributes – the highest good, so that heaven and man a reason, heaven and man through; obedience to the will of God, it is expressed in the compliance with the principles of heaven.

He Guanghu points out that the heaven of Religious Confucianism is the heaven that blesses the people and reprieves sins, and is a supreme god with a will and personality. Lai Yonghai points out that heaven, or God, is the supreme deity of Confucianism, and that the will of heaven is the fundamental starting point for all political and ethical principles of Confucianism. The deity system with God as the supreme deity is the belief system of Religious Confucianism. God was originally the ancestral god of the past. The Confucians of the Song Dynasty described Heaven, Reason, and Emperor (God) as concepts of the same reality and different names, but only changed the concept of God, not the essence of God as the master of the world. Confucius and the best Confucians were worshiped as public gods of the state after their death. Monarchs and Confucians were the rulers and teachers who honored God's command to govern and educate the people. Since the Song Dynasty, Confucians have used philosophical theories of the relationship between reason and qi and the nature of the mind to argue that the teachings of benevolence, righteousness, propriety, wisdom, and the virtues of loyalty, faith, filial piety, and fraternity are the nature given to each person by Heaven, so it is one's duty to observe these principles. Confucianism is essentially the study of the interpretation of the scriptures.

On the other hand, some scholars believe that not only Confucianism, but also Confucianism itself, is a human-centered, atheistic religion. The Chinese attach importance to funeral rites, family continuity, filial piety, and returning to one's roots, and respect for ancestors can be considered a habit. Some contemporary Chinese would equate religion with superstition and reject it in word and deed, and thus often do not consider Confucianism as a religion.

Chin-Shing Huang believes that the debate over whether Confucianism is a religion or not in modern times is based on "Christianity" as the basis of religion, and this is how Confucianism is judged. However, this concept differs greatly from traditional religious views, and is different from the three religions of Confucianism, Buddhism, and Taoism that have existed since the Eastern Han Dynasty and could become independent religious entities. The report of the Taiwan Old Practices Survey published in 1910 positioned Confucianism as a religion, stating, "Confucianism is the ancient doctrine of the saints and kings as ancestrally described by Confucius and Mencius, which includes religion, morality and politics, and the three are integrated into a large religious system.

Taiwan Private Law", citing the "Journal of Taiwan Prefecture", lists Jade Emperor, Dongyue Emperor, Beiji Dadi, Mazu, Wugu Xiandi, Baosheng Dadi, Lords of the Three Mountains, Shuixian Zunwang, Tan Goan-kong, Guang Ze Zun Wang, Goddess Zhu Sae, and Chen Jinggu, Emperor Huaguang, Goryō faith, Righteous People's Faith, City God, Tudigong, Kitchen God, Wenchang Wang and Kui Xing are all gods belonging to Religious Confucianism. Later, Fukutaro Masuda argued that the religion of the Taiwanese is "a large folk religion that is a mixture of Taoism, Confucianism, and Buddhism," faithfully reflecting traditional religious concepts. Kataoka's book "Taiwan Folklore" also inherited this religious view and expanded the scope of Religious Confucianism during the Japanese rule. Religious Confucianism was not limited to folk beliefs during the Japanese rule period. In 1941, the entry of "Huang Chunqing" in the "Public Records of Personnel": Huang Chunqing's religion was "Religious Confucianism". Confucianism". Both Huang Chunqing and Wei Qingde crossed over from the Japanese rule period to the postwar period, and their religious beliefs were both positioned as Religious Confucianism. In 1918, Religious Confucianism was listed as the top of "Religion" in the "Journal of the Native Land" compiled by the Bajiran Public School (now Shihlin Elementary School).

Confucian Churches 

The Confucian church ( or ) is a Confucian religious and social institution of the congregational type. It was first proposed by Kang Youwei (1858–1927) near the end of the 19th century, as a state religion of Qing China following a European model.

Since the early years of the Republic of China, Kang Youwei's Confucian movement advocated the separation of Religious Confucianism from the state bureaucracy, allowing everyone to Sacrifice to Heaven according to the Christian model.

The "Confucian church" model was later replicated by overseas Chinese communities, who established independent Confucian churches active at the local level, especially in Indonesia and the United States.

There has been a revival of Confucianism in contemporary China since around 2000, which has triggered the proliferation of Confucian academies; the opening and reopening of temples of Confucius; the new phenomenon of grassroots Confucian communities or congregations; and renewed talks about a national "Confucian church". With the participation of many Confucian leaders, a national Holy Confucian Church was established on 1 November 2015; its current spiritual leader is Jiang Qing.

Indonesian Confucian Church 

Confucianism originated in China and was brought to Indonesia by Chinese merchants as early as the 3rd century AD. Unlike other religions, Confucianism evolved more into loose individual practices and belief in the code of conduct, rather than a well-organised community with a sound theology—akin to a way of life or social movement than a religion. It was not until the early 1900s that Confucianists formed an organisation, called Khong Kauw Hwe (THHK) in Batavia.

The development of the Confucian Church in Indonesia began in 1900, when the Chinese Association was established, with Pan Jinghe and Chen Jinshan as president and secretary, respectively; the leader of the Chinese Association, Lie Kim Hok, wrote an article entitled "Chinese in 1923, representatives of Confucian churches from all over the world held the first national congress in Java, Surakarta in Central Java, where it was unanimously agreed to establish the Confucian General Assembly, based in Bandung, which was later formally It was later formally established in 1924, and elected Zhang Zhenyi and Hu Yingkong as the president and secretary of the General Council. After the Japanese invasion of Indonesia, the Confucian Church was considered to be against Japan and all its activities were frozen.

After the Indonesian independence in 1945, Confucianism was affected by several political conflicts. In 1965, Sukarno issued Presidential Decree No. 1/Pn.Ps/1965, recognising that six religions are embraced by the Indonesian people, including Confucianism. In 1961, the Association of Khung Chiao Hui Indonesia (PKCHI) (now the Supreme Council for the Confucian Religion in Indonesia) had declared that Confucianism is a religion and Confucius is their prophet.

During the New Order, the anti-China policy became a scapegoat-like method to gain political support from the masses, especially after the fall of PKI, which had allegedly been backed by China. In 1967, Suharto issued controversial Presidential Instruction No. 14/1967, which effectively banned Chinese culture, including documents printed in Chinese, expressions of Chinese belief, Chinese celebrations and festivities, and even Chinese names. However, Suharto acknowledged that the Chinese Indonesians had a large amount of wealth and power, despite consisting only 3% of the population.

In 1969, Statute No. 5/1969 was passed, restoring the official total of six religions. However, it was not always put into practice. In 1978, the Minister of Home Affairs issued a directive asserting there are only five religions, excluding Confucianism. On 27 January 1979, a presidential cabinet meeting decided that Confucianism is not a religion. Another Minister of Home Affairs directive in 1990 re-iterated the total of five official religions in Indonesia. Therefore, the status of Confucianism during the New Order regime was never clear. De jure, there were conflicting laws, because higher laws permitted Confucianism, but lower ones did not recognise it. De facto, Confucianists were not recognised by the government, and they were forced to register with one of the original five official religions to maintain their citizenship. This practice was applied in many places, including the national registration card, marriage registration, and family registration card. Civics education in Indonesia taught school children that there are only five official religions.

Following the fall of Suharto in 1998, Abdurrahman Wahid was elected as the country's fourth president. He rescinded the 1967 Presidential Instruction and the 1978 Home Affairs Ministry directive, and Confucianism once again became officially recognised as a religion in Indonesia. Chinese culture and activities were again permitted.

At present, the General Confucian Church of Indonesia (MAKIN) has about 200 branches throughout Indonesia. Confucian churches organize their members to engage in religious prayers, singing hymns and studying scriptures on a regular basis mainly in auditoriums, and also carry out activities such as traditional Chinese festivals, Confucian rituals on Christmas Day (i.e. Confucius' Birthday or Confucius' Christmas Day), family support, children's education, civil marriages and weddings for couples, funeral ceremonies held for the deceased elderly, charity and disaster relief. The Confucian Church publishes various Confucian classics as well as books such as "Stories of the Sacred Signs of Confucius", "Confucian Hymns", "Liturgy Manual", "Chinese Culture", etc. It also produces various paraphernalia and souvenirs such as hymn discs, dragon and qilin patterns. Since the Chinese language was banned for decades, the books currently published are almost exclusively in Indonesian, and Confucians hope that their children will learn Chinese and read the original scriptures and materials. Indonesian Confucians see Qufu as a "holy place" and hope to visit it at least once in their lifetime.

See also 
 Confucianism
 Confucius
 Confucian Academy
 Confucius Institute
 Ancestor veneration in China
 Shendao

Notes

References

Bibliography 

 
 .
 
 
 
 
 
 
 
  Volume I: The Ancient Eurasian World and the Celestial Pivot, Volume II: Representations and Identities of High Powers in Neolithic and Bronze China, Volume III: Terrestrial and Celestial Transformations in Zhou and Early-Imperial China.
 .
 
 .
 .
 
 .
 .
 .
 
 
 
 .
 
 .
 
 .
 .
 .
 
 
 
 
Articles

External links

 黃克武：〈民國初年孔教問題之爭論，1913–1917 （页面存档备份，存于）〉。
 張祥龍：〈Religious Confucianism的重建〉 （页面存档备份，存于）（2008）
 張祥龍：〈重建Religious Confucianism的危險、必要及其中行路線〉 （页面存档备份，存于）（2008）
 吳震：〈近代中国转型时代"政教关系"问题——以反思康有为"孔教"运动为核心 （页面存档备份，存于）〉。
 柯若樸：〈「民間Religious Confucianism」概念之試探：以臺灣儒宗神教為例 （页面存档备份，存于）〉。

Spiritual practice
East Asian religions
Religion in China
Chinese philosophy
Confucianism
 
Pages with unreviewed translations